Cossack Rada (Kozats'ka Rada) or General Military Council was a general Cossack assembly (council) often military in nature.

Originally established at the Zaporizhian Sich, the rada (council) was an institution of Cossack administration in Ukraine from the 16th to the 18th century. With the establishment of the Hetman state in 1648, it was officially known as the General Military Council until 1750.

One of the most famous of those councils was the Chorna rada of 1663, described in the novel  Chorna Rada (The Black Council) by Panteleimon Kulish. At that council the Hetmanate faction of Khmelnytsky were deposed from the government and replaced by Bryukhovetsky, the first hetman who became the Russian boyar.

List of General Cossack Councils
 1648 (Sich): election of Bohdan Khmelnytskyi as the Hetman of Zaporizhian Host
 1654 (Pereyaslav): adaptation of the Treaty of Pereyaslav
 1657 (Korsun): adaptation of the Treaty of Korsun, confirmation of Ivan Vyhovsky as the Hetman of Zaporizhian Host
 1659 (Hermanivka)
 1663 (Nizhyn): election of Ivan Bryukhovetsky as the Hetman of Zaporizhian Host
 1669 (Korsun)
 1669 (Hlukhiv)
 1669 (Uman), council of the three regiments
 1684 (Mohyliv-Podilskyi)

See also
Chorna rada of 1663
 Sich Rada

References

External links
 Cossack Council at the Dictionary on the History of Ukraine
 General Military Council at the Encyclopedia of Ukraine

 
Historical legislatures
Political history of Ukraine